An Admiral of the Fleet of the Soviet Union was the highest naval rank of the Soviet Union.

Overview
The rank was largely honorary and could be considered equivalent to admiral of the fleet in other nations. It was formally established by the Council of Ministers of the Soviet Union on March 3, 1955, and replaced a similarly named rank, Fleet Admiral/Admiral of the Fleet (aдмирал флота) that had been equivalent to marshal of the Soviet Union since 1945. The holders were entitled to a marshal's star.

Upon its creation, the only two admirals of the fleet, Nikolai Kuznetsov and Ivan Isakov, were "promoted" to this rank. Less than a year later Kuznetsov was demoted to vice admiral for political reasons in 1956 and Isakov remained the only admiral of the fleet of the Soviet Union until his death in 1967. Then, in October 1967, Fleet Admiral Sergei Gorshkov became the third and final admiral of the fleet of the Soviet Union. Gorshkov died in 1988 and no further appointments were made before the fall of the Soviet Union in 1991 and the elimination of the rank.

From 1962 onwards, it was one grade higher than Fleet Admiral, which was recreated as an intermediate rank, equivalent to Army General.

List of admirals of the fleet of the Soviet Union

See also
Ranks and rank insignia of the Soviet Army 1943–1955, and ... 1955–1991
Marshal of the Soviet Union
Soviet military ranks

Notes

References

Soviet admirals
Admirals of the Fleet of the Soviet Union
Admirals
Soviet Navy
Military ranks of the Soviet Union